Maria Klemensa (Helena) Staszewska of Jesus Crucified (30 July 1890 - 27 July 1943) was a Polish Ursuline nun who helped protect Jews and refugees during World War II. For her activities she was arrested by the Gestapo on 26 January 1943 and sent to Auschwitz concentration camp, where she died of typhus on 27 July 1943. In 1999 she was beatified by Pope John Paul II as one of the 108 Blessed Polish Martyrs.

References 

1890 births
1943 deaths
Beatifications by Pope John Paul II
19th-century Polish Roman Catholic nuns
108 Blessed Polish Martyrs
Polish people who died in Auschwitz concentration camp